Death of Apartheid (US title: Mandela's Fight For Freedom) is the name of a three-part documentary series about the negotiations to end apartheid in South Africa and the first fully democratic election that followed. The series was first broadcast in May 1995, and produced by Brian Lapping Associates (now part of Ten Alps company) for the BBC, and co-produced by the Dutch broadcaster VPRO, the South African broadcaster SABC, and the Japanese broadcaster NHK.

The series was largely written and researched by Allister Sparks, who also narrated it. The series was accompanied by a book by Sparks, named Tomorrow Is Another Country.

Episodes

See also
Negotiations to end apartheid in South Africa

References

External links
Death of Apartheid at imdb.com

1990s British documentary television series
1995 British television series debuts
1995 British television series endings
Apartheid films
BBC television documentaries
Documentary films about apartheid
English-language television shows
BBC television documentaries about politics